Patrick O'Donnell may refer to:

 Pat O'Donnell (Australian footballer) (1876–1915)
 Pat O'Donnell (born 1991), American football punter
 Patrick O'Donnell (Invincible) (1835–1883), member of the Irish National Invincibles
 Patrick O'Donnell (cardinal) (1856–1927), Roman Catholic Cardinal Archbishop of Armagh, Primate of All Ireland
 Patrick Mary O'Donnell (1897–1980), Irish-born Roman Catholic priest in Australia
 Patrick O'Donnell (Canadian general) (1940–2015)
 Patrick O'Donnell (California politician) (born 1966), member of the California State Assembly
 Patrick O'Donnell (Irish politician) (died 1970), Irish Fine Gael politician from Donegal
 Patrick J. O'Donnell (died 2016), professor of psychology at the University of Glasgow
 Patrick K. O'Donnell, American author, historian
 Patrick Denis O'Donnell, Irish military historian

See also
Patty O'Donnell (born 1954), American politician in Vermont